Ratnadeva II (1120-1135 CE) was the greatest ruler of the Kalachuri dynasty of Ratnapura, in modern-day Indian state of Chhattisgarh. He is known for declaring independence from their overlords, the Kalachuris of Tripuri and defeated an army sent by the Kalachuri king Gayakarna. He is also known for repulsing an invasion by the mighty king of Kalinga, Anantavarman Chodaganga. His predecessor was Jajalla-deva I (1090-1120 CE), his father and was succeeded by Prithvi-deva II (1135-1165 CE), who was most likely his son.

Reign
Ratnadeva II is known for declaring independence from their overlords, the Kalachuris of Tripuri. He defeated an army sent by the Kalachuri king Gayakarna. He also repulsed an invasion by the mighty king of Kalinga, Anantavarman Chodaganga of the Eastern Ganga Dynasty. He boasts in an inscription of his, that he had defeated  King Chodaganga, ruler of Kalinga.

Inscriptions and coins
Ratnadeva II's inscriptions have been found at- Akaltara, Paragaon, Shivrinarayan (or Sheorinarayan), Sarkhon (or Sarkho) 
Many coins of Ratnadeva II have been found at:
Sanasari (or Sonsari): 96 gold coins  
Sarangarh: 29 gold coins 
Dadal-Seoni: 136 gold coins 
Ratanpur: 10 gold coins 
Sonpur and Baidyanatha: 9 gold coins

See also

 Kalachuris of Ratnapura
 Anantavarman Chodaganga
 Kalachuris of Tripuri
 Gayakarna

References

Bibliography 

 
 
 
 

History of Ratnapura District